Tracer Bullet or tracer bullet may refer to:
Tracer ammunition, bullets that are built with a small pyrotechnic charge in their base
Tracer Bullet, a fictional detective, alter ego of Calvin in the comic strip Calvin and Hobbes
A term used in Scrum (software development) to describe a proof-of-concept deliverable
Pathfinder (library science) - a term for those pathfinders produced by the Library of Congress.

See also
 Tracer (disambiguation)
 Bullet (disambiguation)